Bharatiya Vidya Bhavan's Public School - Vidyashram, Jubilee Hills, also known as BVBPSJH, is a private secondary school run by the Bharatiya Vidya Bhavan educational trust in Jubilee Hills, Hyderabad, India. It is affiliated to the Central Board of Secondary Education. The principal of the school is Ms. Arunasree ma'am

Houses
The students are categorized into different houses namely - Arjuna, Karna, Krishna, Markandeya, Sri Rama and Vasishta. Each house has a color:
 Arjuna     - yellow
 Karna      - orange
 Krishna     - blue
 Markandeya - violet
 Sri Rama   - green
 Vasishta   - red

Each house has a captain, vice-captain. There is also an overall school prefectorial team, known collectively as the "Apex Body" with school head boy and girl, cultural prefect boy and girl, literary prefect boy and girl, social service prefect boy and girl and sports prefect boy and girl.

Awards
The school has been a recipient of several awards, namely Intel Award at national level, Computer Literacy Award both at state and national level, 5S Award, instituted by CII International School Award (ISA) instituted by British Council. The school also received the prestigious e-India Jury's Award at national level, Asset Question Making Contest at South Zone and National Level and Heritage Award instituted by INTACH.

Notable alumni
Nara Lokesh
Tarun Kumar
Archana (actress)
Varun Tej
Nara Brahmini
Raja Goutham
Ravi Verma
Ram mohan Naidu(s/o Yerram Naidu)

See also
Education in India
List of schools in India
List of schools in Hyderabad, India

References

External links 

Schools in Hyderabad, India
1979 establishments in Andhra Pradesh
Educational institutions established in 1979